Chandu may refer to:

Entertainment
Chandu (1958 film), a 1958 Hindi film
Chandu (2002 film), a 2002 Kannada film
Chandu the Magician (radio), an American radio series
Chandu the Magician (film), a 1932 film adaptation of the radio series

People
Chandrashekhar Prasad (20 September 1964 – 31 March 1997), an Indian activist and student leader
Chandu (film director) (born 1975), Indian film director, producer, and screenwriter
Chandu Borde (born 1934), Indian cricketer
Chandu Chekaver, a legendary Hindu warrior
Chandu Lal Sahu (born 1959), Indian politician
Chandu Sarwate (1920–2003), Indian cricketer
Pazhayamviden Chandu, an Indian general
Thacholi Chandu, a legendary Hindu warrior

Fictional characters
Chandu, a tiger sidekick to Sindbad in Sindbad's Storybook Voyage

Other uses
Chandu (opium), a form of opium
Chandu (Gurgaon), a village near Gurgaon in Northern India

See also